Giuseppe "Pino" Porzio (born Naples; February 26, 1967) is a coach and a former Italian water polo player. He is one of the most titled European coaches of all time, and, as his list of prizes demonstrates, is one of the most winning sportsmen among Italian athletes. He has won, both as a player and as a coach, 43 titles including: Olympics, World Cup, European Championships, World Championships, 2 Mediterranean Games, 7 Champions League, 3 European Super Cup, Adriatic League 1, 2 Comen Cup, 16 League titles, 7 Italian Championships.

Playing career
For 16 years, from 1982 to 1998, he played in the top flight with the Posillipo  with his brother Franco, winning almost everything: 8 Italian Championships, 2 LEN Champions Cup and LEN Cup Winners' Cup, with the national team won the Olympic gold medal in '92, won two editions of the Mediterranean Games in 1991 and in 1993, 1 European Championships in the 1993, World Cup in the 1993 and the 1 World Championships in 1994.

In the book "Nel nome del padre del figlio e dello sport" (finalist for the Bancarella 2013 award) dedicated to the great families of Italian sport, the journalist Franco Esposito writes about Pino Porzio as "a tactical leader, the organizer of the defense. A Beckenbauer's water polo. Knowing, timely and decisive with his shot hurts your opponents. "

His brother Franco says: "Pino is apparently thoughtful, cold, calculating but basically it's a mask... We believe in the group, in the union of men."

Coaching
Pino Porzio confirms his talent as a coach, winning the championship in 2003-2004 and the European Cup in 2004-2005 with the 'Posillipo Team' before switching to Pro Recco in 2005, where he won 7 Italian Championships, 4 Champions League, 6 Italy cups, 3 European Super Cups and 1 Adriatic League. June 6, 2012 he resigned as manager of the recchelina team.

"Giuseppe Porzio wins everything, absolutely everything.'s Victory is a gift of nature. A matter of DNA. Pacato and thoughtful, Pino Porzio is born coach. Takes from all: De Crescenzo, Dennerlein, Rudic." From teachers Marsili Mino and Mino Cacace."

"Study Basketball, Rugby provides you with interesting ideas. << The water polo moves into his shell. Unique & inimitable >>. Pino Porzio left Posillipo as champion of Europe and goes to coach Recco. Pineo Porzio ruler and dictator in Recco, the world capital of water polo.

He is currently coaching under a temporary contract with Water Polo Canada (January-April 2016).

Record
Pino Porzio won, both as a player and as a coach, 43 titles including: Olympics, World Cup, European Championships, World Championships, 2 Mediterranean Games, 7 Champions League, 3 European Super Cup, Adriatic League 1, 2 Comen Cup, 16 League titles, 7 Italian Championships.

 Join 10 finals of the Champions League including 8 consecutive coach
 Only one to win European Championships and LEN Euroleague Champions League
 In addition, only one to win a total of 7 European Cup / Euroleague / LEN Champions League and titled clubs in Europe: Partizan, Pro Recco and Mladost
 3 grand slam (European Cup / UEFA Super Cup / Shield / Cup Italy) 2007-2008-2010
 21 final championship (16 wins)
 2004/2012 In these nine years before driving the Posillipo and then Pro Recco in final of all competitions : 28 of 28, with 23 wins.

Palmarès

Playing career
 Olympic gold medals - Barcellona 1992
 World Cup gold medals - Roma 1994
 European Cup gold medals - Sheffield 1993
 2 Mediterranean Games - Gold medals - Atene 1991 / Canet en roussillon 1993
 8 Italian Cups - Posillipo: 1984-85, 1985–86, 1987–88, 1988–89, 1992–93, 1993–94, 1994–95, 1995-96
 Champions League/Euroleague - Posillipo: 1996-97, 1997–98
 LEN Cup Winners' Cup - Posillipo: 1987-88

Coaching
 2 Comen Cup: Ortigia: 2001-02, 2002–03
 8 Italian Cups: Posillipo: 2003-04 / Recco: 2005-06, 2006–07, 2007–08, 2008–09, 2009–10, 2010–11, 2011–12
 6 Italian League Cups: Recco: 2005-06, 2006–07, 2007–08, 2008–09, 2009–10, 2010–11
 5 Champions League/Euroleague: Posillipo: 2004-05 / Recco: 2006-07, 2007–08, 2009–10, 2011–12
 3 European Super Cup: Recco: 2007, 2008, 2010
 1 Adriatic League: Recco: 2011-2012

See also
 Italy men's Olympic water polo team records and statistics
 List of Olympic champions in men's water polo
 List of Olympic medalists in water polo (men)
 List of world champions in men's water polo
 List of World Aquatics Championships medalists in water polo

References

External links
 

1967 births
Living people
Water polo players from Naples
Italian male water polo players
Olympic water polo players of Italy
Water polo players at the 1992 Summer Olympics
Olympic gold medalists for Italy
Olympic medalists in water polo
Medalists at the 1992 Summer Olympics
Italian water polo coaches
Canada men's national water polo team coaches